Coralliophila robillardi is a species of sea snail, a marine gastropod mollusk, in the family Muricidae, the murex snails or rock snails.

Distribution
This species occurs in the Indian Ocean off Mauritius.

References

 Liénard, E., 1871. Description d'espèces nouvelles provenant de l'île Maurice. Journal de Conchyliologie 19: 71-74
 Oliverio, M. (2008). Coralliophilinae (Neogastropoda: Muricidae) from the southwest Pacific. in: Héros, V. et al. (Ed.) Tropical Deep-Sea Benthos 25. Mémoires du Muséum national d'Histoire naturelle (1993). 196: 481-585.

External links
 Liénard, E., 1870. Description d'espèces nouvelles provenant de l'île Maurice. Journal de Conchyliologie 18: 304-305
 MNHN, Paris: syntype

robillardi
Gastropods described in 1870